Hortensia Antommarchi (1850 – 1915, in Cúcuta, Colombia) was a Colombian poet who published numerous poems. Hortensia's sisters, Dorila Antommarchi and Elmira Antommarchi, were also published poets. Hortensia died in 1915 in Cúcuta, Colombia.

See also

 François Carlo Antommarchi

References

1850 births
1915 deaths
19th-century Colombian poets
Colombian people of French descent
Colombian women poets
People from Cúcuta
19th-century Colombian women writers